Abkesheh (also Romanized as Ābkesheh; also known as Ābgesheh and Maḩalleh-ye Ābkesh) is a village in Tarq Rud Rural District, in the Central District of Natanz County, Isfahan Province, Iran. At the 2006 census, its population was 78, in 28 families.

References 

Populated places in Natanz County